Rakotoniaina is a Malagasy surname.

People
 Justin Rakotoniaina (1933 – 2001), Malagasy diplomat and politician
 Pety Rakotoniaina (born 1962), Malagasy politician
 Lova Adrien Marie Rakotoniaina, Malagasy politician

Malagasy-language surnames
Surnames of Malagasy origin